The UEFA Player of the Year Award may refer to:

 UEFA Men's Player of the Year Award, the best male footballer in Europe
 UEFA Women's Player of the Year Award, the best female footballer in Europe